Kongsberg Automotive Holding ASA is an automotive parts  manufacturer founded in Kongsberg, Norway with headquarters in Zurich, Switzerland. The company produces a broad range of parts with production plants throughout the world. The company is listed on the Oslo Stock Exchange with the ticker symbol KOA.

History
The company started as a division of Kongsberg Våpenfabrikk in 1957 with an agreement with Volvo to produce brakes for the company's trucks. In the 1970s the division expanded with factories in Hvittingfoss and Rollag. On 24 March 1987, the division was demerged as a separate company. On 1 January 2008, Kongsberg bought out the automotive division of Teleflex Automotive.

References

External links
 
 KAHOSE Your Flexible PTFE Hose Partner

Manufacturing companies of Norway
Companies based in Buskerud
Automotive companies established in 1987
Companies listed on the Oslo Stock Exchange